The setaceous Hebrew character (Xestia c-nigrum) is a moth of the family Noctuidae. The species was first described by Carl Linnaeus in his 1758 10th edition of Systema Naturae. It is found in the Palearctic realm. It is a common species throughout Europe and North Asia and Central Asia, South Asia, China, Japan and Korea. It is also found in North America, from coast to coast across Canada and the northern United States to western Alaska. It occurs in the Rocky Mountains from Montana to southern Arizona and New Mexico. In the east, it ranges from Maine to North Carolina. It has recently been recorded in Tennessee.

The forewings of this species are reddish brown with distinctive patterning towards the base; a black mark resembling the Hebrew letter nun (נ) with a pale cream-coloured area adjacent to this mark. The hindwings are cream coloured.

Description

The wingspan is 35–45 mm. Forewing purplish grey or purplish fuscous with a leaden gloss; costal area at middle ochreous, merged with the bluntly triangular orbicular stigma: cell, a submedian basal blotch, and costal spot before apex purplish black; claviform stigma minute; reniform large, the lower lobe purplish; hindwing ochreous whitish, in female with the termen broadly fuscous.

Lava pink with a broad dark brown subdorsal band. A lateral yellow band with a brown spot on it. Head reddish brown in color.

Biology
Two broods are produced each year and the adults are on the wing between May and October. This moth flies at night and is attracted to light and sugar, as well as flowers such as Buddleia, ivy and ragwort.

The larva is pale brown red-brown or green with obscure paler dorsal and subdorsal lines and a broad pale ochreous spiracular line. It feeds on a huge variety of plants (see list below). The species overwinters as a larva.
 The flight season refers to the British Isles. This may vary in other parts of the range.

Recorded food plants
Documented food plants include:

Acer – maple
Allium – onion
Apium – celery
Avena – oat
Beta – beet
Brassica
Calendula – marigold
Chrysanthemum
Cichorium – chicory
Cirsium – creeping thistle
Comptonia – sweetfern
Daucus – carrot
Epilobium – rosebay willowherb
Helianthus
Hordeum – barley
Hypericum – St John's wort
Lactuca – lettuce
Lamium – dead-nettle
Lantana
Linum
Lobelia
Lycopersicon – tomato
Malus – apple
Medicago – alfalfa (lucerne)
Myosotis – forget-me-not
Nicotiana – tobacco
Photinia
Pisum – pea
Plantago – plantain
Platanus – Oriental plane
Primula
Pyrus – pear
Rheum – rhubarb
Ribes – currant
Rumex
Senecio – groundsel
Solanum – potato
Solidago – goldenrods
Spiraea
Stellaria – chickweed
Taraxacum – dandelion
Thalictrum – meadow-rue
Trifolium – clover
Triticum – wheat
Urtica – nettle
Vaccinium
Veratrum
Viburnum
Viola
Vitis – grape
Zea – maize (corn)

See also 

 Hebrew character (Orthosia gothica), another moth species with similar markings
 Polygrammate hebraeicum

References

Chinery, Michael. Collins Guide to the Insects of Britain and Western Europe 1986 (Reprinted 1991)
Skinner, Bernard. Colour Identification Guide to Moths of the British Isles 1984

External links

"10199 Xestia c-nigrum (Linnaeus, 1758) - Schwarzes C". Lepiforum e.V. Retrieved January 22, 2019.
Fauna Europaea

Xestia
Moths described in 1758
Agricultural pest insects
Moths of Asia
Moths of Europe
Moths of North America
Taxa named by Carl Linnaeus